Yves Beaudoin (born January 7, 1965) is a Canadian retired ice hockey defenceman who played in the National Hockey League.

Beaudoin was born in Pointe-aux-Trembles, Quebec. Drafted by the Washington Capitals in 1983, Beaudoin played parts of three seasons with the Capitals.

He retired from professional hockey in 1990.  Seven years later he came out of retirement to play for the Quebec Senior Professional Hockey League (QSPHL) before retiring again in 2002.

External links

Profile at hockeydraftcentral.com

1965 births
Living people
Binghamton Whalers players
Canadian ice hockey defencemen
French Quebecers
Washington Capitals draft picks
Washington Capitals players
Ice hockey people from Montreal
Hull Olympiques players
Shawinigan Cataractes players